Richard Lints is the Vice President for Academic Affairs and Dean of Gordon-Conwell Theological Seminary's Hamilton Campus. He is also the Andrew Mutch Distinguished Professor of Theology at Gordon-Conwell and is an author. Lints has been with Gordon-Conwell Theological Seminary since 1986.

He has also taught at Trinity College in Bristol, England, and from 1999 to 2000 he was Visiting Professor at Yale University. Lints is ordained in the Presbyterian Church in America. He is also a regular contributor to the Modern Reformation magazine, the Center for Gospel and Culture, and the Gospel Coalition.

Lints received his B.A. from Westminster College (Philosophy/Religion), A.M. from the University of Chicago (Theology), M.A. from the University of Notre Dame (Philosophy) and Ph.D. from the University of Notre Dame (Philosophy). He has also taught at Trinity College, Bristol, Yale Divinity School, the University of Notre Dame, Westminster Theological Seminary and Reformed Theological Seminary.

Works

Books

Journal articles

References

Leaders of Christian parachurch organizations
American Presbyterians
American Calvinist and Reformed theologians
Westminster College (Pennsylvania) alumni
University of Notre Dame alumni
University of Chicago alumni
Gordon–Conwell Theological Seminary faculty
Year of birth missing (living people)
Living people
University of Notre Dame faculty
20th-century Calvinist and Reformed theologians
21st-century Calvinist and Reformed theologians
Staff of Trinity College, Bristol